The Aryan Nations Sadistic Souls Motorcycle Club, also known as Sadistic Souls MC, is a white-supremacist outlaw motorcycle club founded in 2010. Since 2014, they have been listed as an active neo-Nazi group in annual reports conducted by the Southern Poverty Law Center.

According to the club's website, the group states that it is "the militant arm" of the Aryan Nations.

Formation 
After serving a seven-year prison sentence for federal weapons charges, ex-Ku Klux Klan member Dennis Michael McGiffen started the Sadistic Souls Motorcycle Club in 2010 with the intention of having the group act as the militant arm of Aryan Nations. McGiffen has been the leader of SSMC since its founding. The club's colors are black & silver.

In July 2012, the Sadistic Souls MC formally merged with the neo-Nazi group Aryan Nations. They are currently known as Aryan Nations Sadistic Souls MC.

The motorcycle club has chapters in Illinois, Oklahoma, Missouri, Wisconsin, Florida, Pennsylvania, Alabama, Ohio, Tennessee, Australia, United Kingdom and New Zealand.

Ideology 

The Sadistic Souls claim to accept any white nationalist regardless of religious belief.

On its official website, the club claims that forced integration is "deliberate and malicious genocide, particularly for a people like the white race, who are now a small minority in the world."

Their club's motto, "The Black & Silver Solution"', is the phrase given to represent a coalition of several racist organizations. More specifically, it refers to the group's alliance with the United Klans of America and The Creativity Movement.

Imagery
Like many other white supremacist and racist skinhead groups, the Aryan Nations Sadistic Souls MC uses various Wehrmacht insignia, including the Totenkopf, the Reichsadler, the doppelte Siegrune and the Nationalflagge.

Since the club's merger with Aryan Nations, many of the Sadistic Souls members can be seen wearing a patch of the Aryan Nations logo, which consists of a Wolfsangel symbol with a sword replacing the crossbar.

See also 
Aryan Nations Motorcycle Riders Division
 List of organizations designated by the Southern Poverty Law Center as hate groups

Footnotes

References

External links

Motorcycle clubs in New Zealand
Motorcycle clubs in the United States
Aryan Nations
2010 establishments in Illinois
Outlaw motorcycle clubs
Gangs in Illinois
Gangs in Oklahoma
Gangs in Missouri
Gangs in Wisconsin
Gangs in Florida 
Gangs in Pennsylvania
Gangs in Alabama
Gangs in Ohio
Gangs in Tennessee
Gangs in Australia
Gangs in the United Kingdom
Gangs in New Zealand
Gangs in the United States
Neo-Nazism in Australia
Neo-Nazism in New Zealand
Neo-Nazi organisations in the United Kingdom